Chalcosyrphus annulipes is a species of hoverfly in the family Syrphidae.

Distribution
Sumatra.

References

Eristalinae
Insects described in 1924
Diptera of Asia
Taxa named by Johannes C. H. de Meijere